Athletics at the 2008 Summer Olympics were held during the last ten days of the games, from August 15 to August 24, 2008, at the Beijing National Stadium.  The Olympic sport of athletics is split into four distinct sets of events: track and field events, road running events, and racewalking events.

Both men and women had very similar schedules of events. Men competed in 24 events and women in 23, as their schedule lacked the 50 km race walk. In addition, both the men's 110 m hurdles and decathlon are reflected in the women's schedule by the 100 m hurdles and heptathlon, respectively.

The Olympic record was broken in 17 returning events. In five events, including the inaugural women's 3000 m steeplechase, the world record was broken.

The athletics was, alongside the Olympic cycling events, one of the few large sports programmes in which the host nation fared comparatively poorly in terms of medals won. Despite a haul of 100 medals at the games as a whole, Chinese athletes took home two bronze medals from the athletics events. The country's foremost athlete Liu Xiang, the 2004 Olympic champion in the 110 metres hurdles, had to withdraw after a false start due to injury.

In the years following the events, results were significantly affected by doping findings; 19 of the 47 events have had amendments to their medal rankings as a result of testing and retesting of samples taken at or before the Games. Multiple medalists have been sanctioned for doping violations. Russia has had the most medals stripped (9).

Medal summary

Medal table
Retrieved from Beijing Olympics 2008 Official Website.

Men

* Athletes who participated in the heats only and received medals.
  The original gold medalist, Rashid Ramzi of Bahrain, was stripped of his gold medal for having committed anti-doping violations. The rest of the competitors were elevated by one position accordingly.
  Jamaican team originally won gold medals but was disqualified due to anti-doping rules violation by Nesta Carter. The CAS dismissed in 2018 the appeal of Jamaican sprinter.
  Russian team originally won bronze medals but was disqualified due to anti-doping rules violation by Denis Alexeev. Following reallocation, Great Britain's Robert Tobin, Andrew Steele, Michael Bingham and Martyn Rooney have been awarded bronze.
  The original bronze medalist, Denys Yurchenko of Ukraine, was stripped of his bronze medal for positive test for the prohibited substance. On 17 April 2017, Derek Miles received the bronze medal.  
  The original bronze medalist, Andrei Mikhnevich of Belarus, was stripped of his bronze medal after being given a lifetime ban in 2013 for doping offences. Dylan Armstrong of Canada has received the bronze.
  Vadim Devyatovskiy and Ivan Tsikhan were originally disqualified for doping, but had their medals reinstated in June 2010 after the Court of Arbitration for Sport ruled that there was an error at the Chinese medical lab.

Women

* Athletes who participated in the heats only and received medals.
  Original silver medalist Elvan Abeylegesse, disqualified, and stripped of and ordered to return silver medal following a positive test for a banned substance at the 2007 World Championships in Athletics. Meseret Defar of Ethiopia was advanced to silver, and Sylvia Kibet of Kenya to bronze.
  Original silver medalist Elvan Abeylegesse, disqualified, and stripped of and ordered to return silver medal following a positive test for a banned substance at the 2007 World Championships in Athletics. Shalane Flanagan was awarded the silver medal and Linet Chepkwemoi Masai the bronze.
  Original bronze medalist Yekaterina Volkova, disqualified, and stripped of and ordered to return bronze medal following retesting of her original in-competition sample returned a positive test for the presence of banned substances. Following medals reallocation Tatyana Petrova-Arkhipova of Russia received the bronze medal.
  Originally won by Team , but gold medals were stripped due to anti-doping rules violation by Yulia Chermoshanskaya. Following medals reallocation Belgium are awarded gold, Nigeria – silver and Brazil – bronze.
  Team  originally won silver medals, while Team  originally placed fourth, but both were disqualified due to anti-doping rules violations -  by Anastasiya Kapachinskaya and Tatyana Firova in the case of Russia and Sviatlana Usovich for Belarus. Following medals reallocation Jamaica are promoted to silver and Great Britain to bronze.
  Original bronze medalist Anna Chicherova, was officially stripped of her bronze medal following a positive retest of her sample from the 2008 Games for the anabolic steroid turinobol. Yelena Slesarenko, and Vita Palamar, originally 4th and 5th, also were disqualified for doping following retests. Originally the 6th place athlete, Chaunte Howard, has received the bronze medal.
  Original silver medalist Tatyana Lebedeva, disqualified, and stripped of and ordered to return silver medal following retesting of her original in-competition sample returned a positive test for the presence of the banned substances. Blessing Okagbare of Nigeria was advanced to silver, Chelsea Hammond of Jamaica to bronze.
  Original bronze medalist Hrysopiyi Devetzi, disqualified, and stripped of and ordered to return bronze medal following retesting of original in-competition samples returned a positive result for banned substances. Original silver medalist Tatyana Lebedeva,  was also disqualified later due to use of banned substances. Olga Rypakova of Kazakhstan was advanced to silver, Yargelis Savigne of Cuba to bronze.
  Original silver medalist Natallia Mikhnevich, disqualified, and stripped of and ordered to return silver medal following retesting of her original in-competition sample returned a positive test for the presence of the banned substances methandienone and stanozolol. Original bronze medalist Nadzeya Ostapchuk, disqualified, and stripped of and ordered to return bronze medal following retesting of her original in-competition sample returned a positive test. Following medals reallocation Misleydis González of Cuba is promoted to silver and Gong Lijiao of China to bronze.
  Retests of samples from the 2008 Summer Olympics detected a positive sample from original silver medalist Yarelys Barrios, for performance-enhancing drugs, and she was stripped of her medal on 1 September 2016. After medal reallocation Olena Antonova received silver and Song Aimin received bronze.
  Original gold medalist Aksana Miankova, disqualified, and stripped of and ordered to return gold medal following retesting of her original in-competition sample returned a positive test for the presence of the banned substances turinabol and oxandrolone. Following medals reallocation Yipsi Moreno of Cuba is promoted to gold, Zhang Wenxiu of China to silver and Manuela Montebrun of France to bronze.
  Maria Abakumova, who originally won the silver medal in the women's javelin, disqualified after she tested positive for dehydrochlormethyltestosterone. Christina Obergföll of Germany was advanced to silver, Goldie Sayers of Great Britain to bronze.
  Lyudmila Blonska, who originally won the silver medal in the women's heptathlon, disqualified after she tested positive for methyltestosterone. Following reallocation Hyleas Fountain of the United States awarded silver, Tatyana Chernova of Russia – bronze. Chernova, who had been awarded the bronze medal following Blonska's disqualification, was herself disqualified after a retest of her 2008 sample was found to also be positive for banned substances, namely turinabol, and the bronze medal was awarded to the 2004 bronze medalist Kelly Sotherton, .

Records broken 

During the 2008 Summer Olympics, 17 new Olympic records and 5 new world records were set in the athletics events.

Men's Olympic and world records

Women's Olympic and world records

Participating nations

See also
 Athletics at the 2008 Summer Paralympics

References

External links

 Official IAAF website
 Olympics Pictures website
 Athletics – Official Results Book

 
2008 Summer Olympics events
2008
2008 Summer Olympics
2008 Olympics